A momordicine is any of several compounds found in the bitter melon vine, Momordica charantia.  They are glycosides of cucurbitane derivatives.  They include
 Momordicine II
 Momordicine IV, 7-O-D-glucopyranosyl-3,23-dihydroxycucurbita-5,24-dien-19-al

Momordicine II and IV can be extracted from the leaves of M. charantia by methanol.  They have been found to deter egg-laying of the leaf mining fly (Liriomyza trifolii) at a combined concentration of 96 µg/cm2.

See also 
 Momordicin (disambiguation)

References 

Triterpene glycosides